Ryley Walker (born July 21, 1989) is an American singer-songwriter and guitarist from Rockford, Illinois.

Biography
Walker, and critics, have cited the band Genesis and singer-songwriter Nick Drake as early influences.

Walker began his career in Chicago's independent music scene after moving there in the early 2010s, releasing several cassette EPs and a vinyl EP. In 2014, he released his debut album for the Tompkins Square label, and followed it early in 2015 with Primrose Green released on Dead Oceans. Backing musicians Walker employed on Primrose Green include several noted Chicago jazz and experimental musicians such as Fred Lonberg-Holm.

Also in 2015, Walker released an instrumental album, recorded in collaboration with fellow Chicago musician , entitled Land of Plenty. It was recorded live during a January 2015 residency at The Whistler nightclub in Chicago. The songs on the album were taken from the last two shows of the residency, on January 25 and 30. MacKay's guitar was recorded on the left channel and Walker's guitar was recorded on the right channel. Their instruments converge in the center. MacKay played 6-string guitar, requinto and glass slide, while Walker played 6 & 12-string guitars. The album's sound was described as fingerstyle ballads, psychedelic waltzes, and raga-inspired blues. The duo's second album, Spiderbeetlebee, was released by Drag City in 2017.  MacKay performs in Walker's live band, from 2017 or earlier through 2021 and has also played on at least one of Walker's other records.

On August 19, 2016, Walker released his fourth solo album, Golden Sings That Have Been Sung, which was yet another change in his evolving sound. His fifth is Deafman Glance, released in May 2018. Walker released The Lillywhite Sessions, an album of covers of the aforementioned Dave Matthews Band album. In 2021 Walker released Deep Fried Grandeur, a live album with the Tokyo band Kikagaku Moyo, and Course in Fable, his sixth solo album of original music, both on his own Husky Pants Records label.

Walker has, as of 2021, released two albums with Chicago-based jazz drummer . The first, Cannots, was released by Dead Oceans in 2016. Little Common Twist was released by Thrill Jockey in November 2019.

As of 2021, recently Walker had gotten sober and had moved from New York City to Vermont.
As of 2022, Walker had moved back to New York.

Discography

Albums
All Kinds of You (Tompkins Square Records, 2014)
Primrose Green (Dead Oceans, 2015)
Land of Plenty (Whistler Records, 2015), with Bill MacKay
Golden Sings That Have Been Sung (Dead Oceans, 2016)
Cannots (Dead Oceans, 2016), with Charles Rumback
Spiderbeetlebee (Drag City, 2017), with Bill MacKay
Deafman Glance (Dead Oceans, 2018)
The Lillywhite Sessions (covers from a 2001 Dave Matthews Band album) (2018)
Little Common Twist (Thrill Jockey, 2019), with Charles Rumback
Deep Fried Grandeur (Husky Pants Records, 2021) with Kikagaku Moyo
Course in Fable (Husky Pants Records, 2021)

EPs
The Evidence of Things Unseen (Plustapes, 2011)
Of Deathly Premonitions (with Daniel Bachman) (Plustapes, 2011)
West Wind (Tompkins Square, 2013)
So Certain EP (Husky Pants Records, 2022)

References

External links

Ryley Walker: October 9, 2015 Rough Trade NYC (Tompkins Square 10th Anniversary) – live recording for free download
Ryley Walker live recordings on Internet Archive

American folk guitarists
American male guitarists
1989 births
Living people
Singer-songwriters from Illinois
Musicians from Rockford, Illinois
Guitarists from Chicago
21st-century American male singers
21st-century American singers
21st-century American guitarists
Dead Oceans artists
American male singer-songwriters